Vemavaram is a village in NTR district of the Indian state of Andhra Pradesh. It is located in Vatsavai mandal of Vijayawada revenue division.

References 

Villages in NTR district